Labanda fasciata is a moth in the family Nolidae first described by Francis Walker in 1865. It is found in Sri Lanka.

References

Moths of Asia
Moths described in 1865
Chloephorinae